The men's 5000 metres event at the 2016 Summer Olympics took place between 16 and 20 August at the Olympic Stadium.

Summary
Mo Farah entered as the favourite for the race, having won the 2012 Olympic title as well as the last two World Championships 5000 m. He also held the fastest time of the year at 12:59:29 minutes and won the Olympic 10,000 m earlier in Rio. His primary challengers included 2015 World medallists Caleb Ndiku of Kenya and Ethiopia's Hagos Gebrhiwet (with the latter having shown the best form that year). Another Ethiopian, Dejen Gebremeskel (the 2012 Olympic runner-up) was also in the race, as was three-time 5000 m world medallist Bernard Lagat.

The preliminaries delivered a shock as distance running power Kenya placed no athletes in the final.  However, three Kenyan immigrants to other countries ran in the final; Paul Kipkemoi Chelimo and 41-year-old Bernard Lagat of the United States and Albert Kibichii Rop of Bahrain. The East African representation was strong with three Ethiopians in the final (plus Birhanu Balew running for Bahrain).  Uganda qualified two athletes.  Mohammed Ahmed running for Canada, Hassan Mead running for the United States and the defending champion Mo Farah running for Great Britain were born in Somalia.  Andrew Butchart was a second British finalist, and David Torrence, an American-born athlete, ran for Peru.  During the first preliminary heat, Mead's front foot met Farah's back foot, both runners stumbling, Mead crashing to the track.  Farah righted himself and continued on to the finish, qualifying third.   After the race a successful protest was filed by the United States, and Mead advanced to the final as a result. No one was disqualified.

This race was the completion of Farah's attempt to complete the second  Woolworth double (5 and 10).  His race tactics were well known and his results consistent.  Somebody had to do something different in order to beat him.  From the gun in the final, two Ethiopian runners went to the front, while Farah dropped to his customary tail end position.  Dejen Gebremeskel and Hagos Gebrhiwet went to the front and were pushing the pace.  Paul Kipkemoi Chelimo moved in behind them.  Farah sensed the change in tactics and moved up much earlier than normal to a position in the middle of the strung out pack, to watch the action.  While the two Ethiopians were sharing the lead duty, Gebrhiwet was taking the lion's share.  19 year old Joshua Kiprui Cheptegei moved in to mark Farah's moves.  With five and a half laps to go, the situation started to change.  Chelimo moved up, passing Gebrhiwet, who fell back into the field.  Farah used this occasion to hit the front.

Down the backstretch with 4 and a half laps to go, many tried to move to the front to mark Farah, with elbows flying in the tightening pack.  From this point Farah began to control the race, with Rop, Chelimo, the third Ethiopian Muktar Edris, Mead, Gebremeskel, Gebrhiwet, Cheptegei, Butchart, Ahmed and Lagat all in a row behind Farah.  During the next lap and a half Butchart moved closer to Farah on the outside, then with almost 3 laps to go, went around the outside and onto Farah's shoulder, creating a British team wall similar to the blocking techniques the Kenyans usually use.  Cheptegei then moved to the outside of the wall making it three wide.  Butchart  was only able to stay there for about a half lap before falling back into the pack, but Cheptegei remained in place.  Edris was looking for a way around.		

With a lap and a half to go, Cheptegei tried to speed up to go around Farah, but Farah exactly matched his speed.  The rules of the road were clearly explained to the youngster, do not pass.  Finally Gebrhiwet, bounced out of the pack several places behind at the same time Edris moved, the two collided with Edris bouncing sideways as Gebrhiwet made the bold move around Cheptegei and was ahead of Farah at the line and sprinting.  He didn't want to give Farah the opportunity to get the jump on him like in the two previous World Championships.  In the next 50 metres, Farah explained the rules of the road to him too, the two exchanging elbows as Farah would not let Gebrhiwet to move to the inside.  When Gebrhiwet relented Chelimo filled the space between him and the curb, right behind Farah.  Down the final backstretch, Gebrhiwet tried one more time, elbowing Chelimo as he went by with Chelimo losing his balance for a moment, then making contact with Ahmed following Gebrhiwet.  Getting untangled, Chelimo ran down the backstretch after Gebrhiwet, who still couldn't get around Farah.  Gebrhiwet slowed a little, Chelimo was again pinned to the curb, more contact with Ahmed as Chelimo was looking for running space.		
Chelimo moved to the outside, leaving Gebrhiwet on the curb behind Farah.  Edris elbowed his way inside of Ahmed as he passed.  After all the contact, Chelimo was in the perfect position to sprint past Farah on the home stretch.  Chelimo almost got to Farah's shoulder but Farah accelerated again, pulling away to the win by five metres, still looking over his shoulder to make sure there was no further challenge.	
Chelimo finished second, Gebrhiwet, Edris, Ahmed and Lagat.

Farah knelt and kissed the track.  After the celebration and victory lap, it was announced that Chelimo, Ahmed and Edris were disqualified, giving Gebrhiwet the silver and Lagat the bronze.  Being interviewed on American television, Chelimo was shocked.  An appeal was filed and the decision was mostly reversed.  Chelimo was reinstated as the silver medalist, Ahmed was also reinstated when it was found that they did not break the rules while Edris' disqualification would stand.

The medals for the competition were presented by Anant Singh, South Africa, IOC member, and the gifts were presented by Ahmed Al Kamali, IAAF Council Member.

Records
Prior to this competition, the existing world and Olympic records were as follows.

The following national record was established during the competition:

Results

Heats
Qualification rules: First 5 in each heat (Q) and the next 5 fastest (q) advance to the Final.

Heat 1

Heat 2

Final

References

Men's 5000 metres
2016
Men's events at the 2016 Summer Olympics